The Orillia Terriers are a Canadian junior ice hockey team based in Orillia, Ontario, Canada.  They played in the Georgian Mid-Ontario Junior C Hockey League until 2016 when the league merged into the Provincial Junior Hockey League.

History
The Orillia Terriers are the first junior hockey club in Orillia since the Orillia Terriers of the Ontario Provincial Junior A Hockey League moved to Rama, Ontario in 1997.

On September 13, 2013, the Terriers travelled to Penetanguishene, Ontario to play their first-ever league game.  The Penetang Kings won the game 4-0, when Gordie Weiss played his first game in net.  The next night, the Terriers hosted the Huntsville Otters in their first home game.  At 12:38 of the first period Josh Allan scored the first goal in team history.  Marty Lawlor scored a hat-trick (including the game winner) and Weiss played the entire game in net to clinch the franchise's first ever victory.

The Terriers finished their first season in seventh place out of ten teams with a record of 17 wins, 19 losses, and 4 regulation ties.

On February 1, 2014, the Terriers played their first playoff game, losing 3-2 in overtime to the Midland Flyers.  Weiss played the entire game and Daniel Lee scored the first playoff marker in team history.

Season-by-season standings

References

External links
Terriers webpage

Ice hockey teams in Ontario
Sport in Orillia
2013 establishments in Ontario
Ice hockey clubs established in 2013